Trubny (masculine), Trubnaya (feminine), or Trubnoye (neuter) may refer to:
 Trubny, Astrakhan Oblast, Russia
 Trubnaya (Moscow Metro)